Kenny Lally (born June 23, 1989) is a Canadian amateur boxer from Prince George, British Columbia. He won a bronze medal in the men's bantamweight category at the 2015 Pan American Games and a silver medal at the 2010 Continental Championships.

Lally is of Indian Punjabi Sikh descent.

References

External links
 

1989 births
Living people
Sportspeople from Prince George, British Columbia
Canadian people of Indian descent
Canadian people of Punjabi descent
Pan American Games bronze medalists for Canada
Boxers at the 2015 Pan American Games
Canadian male boxers
Pan American Games medalists in boxing
Bantamweight boxers
Medalists at the 2015 Pan American Games